Denys Nechyporenko (born 7 January 1990) is a Ukrainian athlete specialising in the 400 metres hurdles. He represented his country at three consecutive European Championships twice reaching the semifinals

His personal best in the event is 50.08 seconds set in Kirovograd in 2014.

International competitions

References

1990 births
Living people
Ukrainian male hurdlers
Ukrainian Athletics Championships winners